In the 1983 Cameroonian Premier League season, 16 teams competed. Tonnerre Yaoundé won the championship.

League standings

References
Cameroon 1983 - List of final tables (RSSSF)

1983 in Cameroonian football
Cam
Cam
Elite One seasons